Hunter Cayll  (born 5. February 1995 Lawrenceburg, Tennessee), also known as "Nubs", is an American amateur competitive shooter who has no hands due to a birth defect called amelia. He also has significant bilateral club foot and unequal leg length. Hunter first started competing in Multi-Gun, and participated in the Open division at the 2015 IPSC Shotgun World Shoot in Agna, Italy  and the 2017 IPSC Rifle World Shoot in Moscow, Russia.

References

External links
Hunter Cayll on Twitter
Official Facebook page

Living people
IPSC shooters
1995 births
People from Lawrenceburg, Tennessee